The 1891 Farmers and Mechanics Savings Bank building in Minneapolis, Minnesota, United States, is a Beaux-Arts style building that formerly served as the headquarters of Farmers and Mechanics Savings Bank. The building is now home to The Downtown Cabaret, a strip club.  Architecture critic Larry Millett writes, "If you step inside for a view of the, ahem, scenery, you'll discover a glass dome that once illuminated a 'ladies banking lobby' but is now the scene of activities not everyone would consider ladylike."

The building was designed by the locally prominent firm of Long and Kees as a one-story building. Long and Kees usually preferred the then-popular Richardsonian Romanesque style for their buildings, but deviated from this style for the bank.  In 1908 architect William Kenyon designed a second-story addition that enlarged the façade while retaining the Beaux-Arts style.  The exterior is faced with white limestone, with five piers of rusticated stone supporting fluted Corinthian pilasters. In 1942, the bank moved to a new location at 88 S. 6th St. at the corner of Sixth and Marquette.  The building was listed on the National Register of Historic Places in 1984.

See also
 List of strip clubs

References

External links

Bank buildings on the National Register of Historic Places in Minnesota
Beaux-Arts architecture in Minnesota
Neoclassical architecture in Minnesota
National Register of Historic Places in Minneapolis
Strip clubs in the United States